Dębniki may refer to the following places in Poland:
Dębniki, Kraków, a district of the city of Kraków
Dębniki, Lower Silesian Voivodeship (south-west Poland)
Dębniki, Łomża County in Podlaskie Voivodeship (north-east Poland)
Dębniki, Zambrów County in Podlaskie Voivodeship (north-east Poland)